McAfee Institute is a professional training website focused on the intelligence and investigative sectors. It was founded in 2010 by Joshua McAfee.
The online service advertises instruction related to topics such as cryptocurrency investigations, cyber intelligence and investigations, counterintelligence, human trafficking, workplace violence, active shooters, organized retail crime, leadership, incident response, digital forensics, fraud, and deception detection.

The McAfee Institute is partnered with the Department of Homeland Security's National Initiative for Cybersecurity Careers and Studies and is listed on their site as a provider of professional certifications. In 2021, McAfee Institute was approved by the Society for Human Resource Management to offer professional development credits.

See also
 Vocational education in the United States

References

Vocational education in the United States
Educational institutions established in 2010
2010 establishments in Missouri